Bowne is an unincorporated community located at the intersection of the boundaries of Delaware, East Amwell and West Amwell townships in Hunterdon County, New Jersey, United States.

The area is named for Dr. John Bowne, a physician who owned a nearby farm. In the 1870s, the Flemington Railroad & Transportation Company constructed a railroad through the area connecting Lambertville and Flemington with a station (originally named Barber Station, renamed to Bowne Station) at the settlement. This railroad became part of the Belvidere Delaware Railroad and the Pennsylvania Railroad in later years. The railroad's current owner, Black River and Western Railroad, started running passenger trains down to Woodsedge Farm in May 2017. Similar in character to the townships in which the settlement is located, Bowne is surrounded by a mix of farmland, forest, and some single family houses along the main roads through the area, Bowne Station Road and Garboski Road.

References

West Amwell Township, New Jersey
East Amwell Township, New Jersey
Delaware Township, Hunterdon County, New Jersey
Unincorporated communities in Hunterdon County, New Jersey
Unincorporated communities in New Jersey